Dmytro Dmytrovych Kasimov (born 14 August 1999) is a Ukrainian professional footballer who plays as a right midfielder.

References

External links
 
 

1999 births
Living people
Footballers from Dnipro
Ukrainian footballers
Association football midfielders
FC Zirka Kropyvnytskyi players
FC Yarud Mariupol players
FC Obolon-Brovar Kyiv players
FC Obolon-2 Kyiv players
FC Mynai players
Ukrainian Premier League players
Ukrainian First League players
Ukrainian Second League players
Ukrainian Amateur Football Championship players